Justyna Majkowska (born Zduńska Wola, 17 July 1977) is a Polish singer. Her career started with the band Erato.  Next, she was a member of Ich Troje, which represented Poland in the Eurovision Song Contest 2003 in Riga with the 7th place song "Keine Grenzen - Żadnych Granic".

In 2003 Justyna left the band. But in 2006 she came back with 1st Ich Troje vocalist Magda Femme. Ich Troje (5 persons now) won Polish preselections to Eurovision Contest "Piosenka Dla Europy", and they represented Poland for the second time at the 2006 Eurovision Song Contest in Athens.

Discography 
Nie czekam na cud (2004, Fonografika)
Zakochana od jutra (2011, Anaconda Productions)

References

External links
Official site

1977 births
Living people
Eurovision Song Contest entrants of 2003
Eurovision Song Contest entrants of 2006
Eurovision Song Contest entrants for Poland
Polish pop singers
21st-century Polish singers
21st-century Polish women singers